Paul Mumford (March 5, 1734 – July 20, 1805) was an American politician and lawyer. Between 1803 and 1805 he was lieutenant governor of the state of Rhode Island.

Career
Mumford grew up during the British colonial era. In 1754 he graduated from what would later become Yale University. After a subsequent law degree, he settled in Newport. He joined the American Revolution in the early 1770s. He became a Member of the Rhode Island House of Representatives in 1774 but had to flee to Barrington, Massachusetts, before the advancing British troops. There he was a member of a convention of the New England states at Springfield, Massachusetts in 1777 to discuss the defence of Rhode Island and the currency issue. Between 1777 and 1781 Mumford served as a judge in various courts in his home state. Then he was chief justice of the Rhode Island Supreme Court from May 1781 to June 1785 and again from May 1786 to June 1788. From 1779 to 1781 he was again a member of the state House of Representatives. Between 1801 and 1803 he was a member of the State Senate.

In 1803 Mumford was elected lieutenant governor of Rhode Island alongside Arthur Fenner. He held this office between 1803 and 1805. He was Deputy Governor and Chairman of the State Senate. He died on July 20, 1805 leaving the lieutenant governorship vacant. After Fenner's death on October 15, 1805, his successor as acting governor was President Pro Tempore of the State Senate, Henry Smith.

References

External links
The Political Graveyard

Lieutenant Governors of Rhode Island
1734 births
1805 deaths
18th-century American judges
Justices of the Rhode Island Supreme Court
People from South Kingstown, Rhode Island
Rhode Island Democratic-Republicans